Sharpay's Fabulous Adventure is the soundtrack album from the movie of the same name. It was released by Walt Disney Records on April 19, 2011 in the United States.

Album information
Sharpay's Fabulous Adventure is a spin-off of the High School Musical series. As the lead star, Ashley Tisdale was required to record several songs for the film as confirmed by herself on May 22, 2010. which were later packaged together into a soundtrack album. Former High School Musical star Lucas Grabeel recorded a cover version of Justin Bieber's hit "Baby" for the film.

Singles
The song "Gonna Shine" became the first single of the album and had a World Premiere on Radio Disney on March 25, 2011.

Track listing

Note: Tracks seven and eight are not available in digital stores.
The deluxe version is exclusive to Walmart.com, and was released on September 13, 2011.

References

External links
 Walt Disney Records official website
 Official album information

2011 soundtrack albums
Cast recordings
Disney film soundtracks
High School Musical albums
Walt Disney Records soundtracks